Euxoa temera is a moth of the family Noctuidae. It is found in Central and Southern Europe, North Africa, the Caucasus, Armenia, Central Asia, Turkey, Iraq and Iran.

The wingspan is 30–35 mm. The moth flies from October to November depending on the location.

The larvae feed on Poaceae species and other low plants.

External links
Moths and Butterflies of Europe and North Africa

Euxoa
Moths of Europe
Moths of Asia
Moths of the Middle East
Moths described in 1808